Earl Thomas Jones (April 26, 1943 – May 29, 2015) was an American racing driver, born in Dallas, Texas.  He entered his own Cooper T82 in one Formula One race, the 1967 Canadian Grand Prix.  After a promising practice performance, he suffered electrical problems during qualifying and only set one very slow lap time.  The stewards denied him a place on the grid on the grounds that he was "too slow", even though he had been competitive in practice runs.

Until quite recently Jones was considered one of Formula One's great obscurities, but it has since emerged that he raced on and off throughout the 1970s in various series before retiring in 1980. 

He ran a welding and metal fabrication company in Cleveland. Jones died in Eastlake, Ohio on 29 May 2015.  His old Cooper T82 still survives and its current owner competes with it in historic racing series.

Complete Formula One results
(key)

References

External links
 

1943 births
2015 deaths
American Formula One drivers
Racing drivers from Dallas
People from Lake County, Ohio